Guinayangan, officially the Municipality of Guinayangan,  is a 3rd class municipality in the province of Quezon, Philippines. According to the 2020 census, it has a population of 44,045 people.

Guinayangan came from a native word for cane "gayang", they "copied"---ginaya and adopted the name to become "ginayangan" or what is now known as "Guinayangan". Its people pronounce it "Ginyangan" omitting the "a" sound.

The municipality is home to the Maulawin Spring Protected Landscape and the critically endangered Inagta Lopez, a dialect of the critically endangered Inagta Alabat language, which has - at most - 30 speakers left in the world.

Geography

Barangays

Guinayangan is politically subdivided into 54 barangays.

Climate

Demographics

Economy

Culture

Festivals

When the month of June comes, the people of Guinayangan, Quezon prepare for the annual celebration of Gayang Festival, wherein the coconut tree and the banana is the main attraction of the festivities. The festival is highlighted by a street dancing competition participated by the residents of different barangays, as well as by elementary and high school students.

In the later part of 2000, the very first Seafoods Festival was held in the town.  However, it was replaced by Gayang Festival in the succeeding years to give importance to the town's history.

Tourism

Education
Elementary schools
Guinayangan Elementary School
St. Aloysius Gonzaga Parochial School
Don Guillermo Elementary School
Gregorio M. Mendoza Elementary School
Sisi Primary School
Gapas Elementary School
Aloneros Elementary School
Danlagan Elementary School
Sta. Cruz Elementary School
San Roque Elementary School
Dancalan Central Elementary School
Dancalan Caimawan Elementary School
Lubigan Elementary School
Arbismen Elementary School
Sintones Elementary School
Capuluan Tulon Elementary School
Nabangka Elementary School
San Isidro Elementary School
Ligpit Bantayan Elementary School
A. Mabini Elementary School
Sta. Maria Primary School
Bagong Silang Elementary School
San Luis I Primary School
San Luis II Elementary School
Dungawan Central Elementary School
Dungawan Paalyunan Elementary School

Secondary schools
 Dungawan National High School
 Guinayangan Academy 
 Guinayangan National High School
 Sta Cruz National High School
 Lamon Bay SOF - Ext. (Aloneros, Guinayangan) 
 Nabangka National High School
 Aloneros National High School
 Saint Aloysius Gonzaga Parochial High School

Tertiary schools
 Guinayangan Institute Of Technology (Permanently Closed)
 G-sisters Learning Institute of Technology (Permanently Closed)
 Guinayangan College Foundation Inc. GCFI

References

External links

 Guinayangan Profile at PhilAtlas.com
 [ Philippine Standard Geographic Code]
 Philippine Census Information
 Local Governance Performance Management System 

Municipalities of Quezon
Populated places established in 1769